Timothy Bowman Sr. (born April 22, 1959) is an American smooth jazz gospel musician. He started his music career, in 1996, with the release of, Love, Joy, Peace, by INSP Media Group (Insync Music) alongside Diamante Records, and they released his first three albums, 1998's Paradise and 2000's Smile. The subsequent album, This Is What I Hear, was released by Liquid 8 Records in 2004. His fifth album, Tim Bowman, released in 2008 by Trippin 'N' Rhythm Records. This album was his breakthrough release upon the Billboard Contemporary Jazz Albums chart.

Early life
Bowman was born on April 22, 1959 as Timothy Bowman in Detroit, Michigan. His older sister is Vickie Winans(who was also a member of International Sounds of Deliverance, a gospel group that he joined after his high school commencement ceremony). His parents were a father who worked in the construction business, Aaron Bowman,  and a mother who was a homemaker, Mattie A. Bowman. He started playing the guitar at 11 years old, and he became a member of The Winans, for a short time during the early to mid-1980s, as their guitarist, after getting an invite to play a show at Mercy College in the presence of Andraé Crouch. He would soon get tired of the endless touring schedule, and left the group in 1987.

Music career
His solo music recording career commenced in May 1996, with the album, Love, Joy, Peace, and it was released by INSP Media Group (Insync Music), who originated from Salem, Oregon, alongside Diamante Records, yet they only made 2,000 units to sell in his hometown of Detroit, and in the span of five weeks half of the units were sold. The labels decided to sell the album nationwide that October. He released two more albums with the labels, 1998's Paradise and 2000's Smile. The subsequent album, This Is What I Hear, was released by Liquid 8 Records on August 3, 2004. His fifth album, Tim Bowman, released on September 30, 2008 by Trippin 'N' Rhythm Records. This album was his breakthrough release upon the Billboard Contemporary Jazz Albums chart, and it placed at a peak of No. 15. He has placed four songs on the Smooth Jazz Songs chart over the course of his career.

Personal life
His son, Tim Bowman Jr., is a gospel music artist in his own right.

Discography

Singles

References

External links
 Official website

African-American jazz musicians
African-American jazz guitarists
American male guitarists
Smooth jazz guitarists
1959 births
Living people
Jazz musicians from Michigan
Songwriters from Michigan
African-American Christians
20th-century American guitarists
21st-century American guitarists
Guitarists from Detroit
20th-century American male musicians
21st-century American male musicians
American male jazz musicians
African-American songwriters
20th-century African-American musicians
21st-century African-American musicians
American male songwriters